Victoria is an unincorporated community in Stockton Township, Greene County, Indiana.

History
Victoria took its name from the Old Victoria Mine.

Geography

References

Unincorporated communities in Greene County, Indiana
Unincorporated communities in Indiana
Bloomington metropolitan area, Indiana